KICA may refer to:

 KICA (AM), a radio station (980 AM) licensed to Clovis, New Mexico, United States
 KICA-FM, a radio station (98.3 FM) licensed to Farwell, Texas, United States

See also

Kıca, Silifke